Progress Publishers was a Moscow-based Soviet publisher founded in 1931.

Publishing program
Progress Publishers published books in a variety of languages: Russian, English, and many other European and Asian languages. They issued many scientific books, books on arts, political books (especially on Marxism–Leninism), classic books, children's literature, novels and short fiction, books in source languages for people studying foreign languages, guidebooks and photographic albums.

Progress Publishers joined with International Publishers in New York and the Communist Party of Great Britain's publishing house, Lawrence and Wishart, in London to publish the 50-volume Collected Works of Karl Marx and Frederick Engels, a project launched in 1975 and completed only in 2004.

Other books published in English by Progress included Marx and Engels on the United States (1979), a compilation drawn from letters, articles, and various other works, and A Short History of the USSR (1984).

One of the common features of all Progress books was their "request to reader" to send an opinion and suggestions on the book. It reads:

Book series
 ABC of Social and Political Knowledge
 Books About the USSR
 Classics of Russian Literature 
 Current International Problems
 Imperialism: Acts, Facts, and Records
 Impressions of the USSR 
 International Communist and Working-Class Movement
 V. I. Lenin: Collected Works 
 Library of Political Knowledge
 Library of Soviet Literature
 Man Through the Ages
 Modern Working-Class Novels Series
 On the Track of Discovery
 Progress Books about the USSR
 Progress Guides to the Social Sciences  
 Progress Marxist-Leninist Theory
 Progress Military Series
 Progress Problems of the Third World (also known as: Problems of the Third World)
 Progress Russian Classics Series (also known as: Russian Classics Series) 
 Progress Soviet Authors Library 
 Russian Readers for Beginners
 Scientific Socialism Series   
 Socialism Today
 Soviet Foreign Policy and International Relations
 Soviet Literature for Young People
 Soviet Military Thought Series
 Soviet Novels Series
 Soviet Short Stories Series
 Stormy Petrel Series
 Student's Library
 Theories and Critical Studies
 War Memoirs

See also

 International Publishers
 Lawrence and Wishart

References

Further reading
 Vijay Prashad, ed., When the East Was Read: Socialist Culture in the Third World, New Delhi: LeftWord Books, 2019.

External links
 Progress Publishers, Moscow - official website
 Rossen Djagalov, Progress Publishers: A Short History, at leftword.org

Political book publishing companies
Publishing companies of the Soviet Union
Book publishing companies of Russia
Publishing companies established in 1931
1931 establishments in the Soviet Union
Defunct book publishing companies
Companies based in Moscow